Live Texxas Jam '78 is a live VHS video by the American hard rock band Aerosmith. It was filmed on the 4th of July weekend at the Cotton Bowl in Dallas where Aerosmith headlined the Texxas World Music Festival. It was released on April 25, 1989. Although not included on the video, the live versions for "Big Ten Inch Record" and "Lord of the Thighs" would later be included on the limited Japanese edition of Just Push Play and on the Pandora's Box box set.

As of October 2018, this is yet to be released on either DVD or Blu-Ray formats.

Track listing 
 "Rats in the Cellar"
 "Seasons of Wither"
 "I Wanna Know Why" *
 "Walkin' the Dog"
 "Walk This Way"
 "Lick and a Promise"
 "Get The Lead Out"
 "Draw the Line"
 "Sweet Emotion"
 "Same Old Song and Dance"
 "Milk Cow Blues"
 "Toys in the Attic"

Personnel
Tom Hamilton
Joey Kramer
Joe Perry
Steven Tyler
Brad Whitford
Mark Radice

Certifications

References

Aerosmith video albums
1989 video albums
Live video albums
1989 live albums
CBS Films films